Pterostylis rubenachii, commonly known as the Arthur River greenhood,  is a plant in the orchid family Orchidaceae and is endemic to Tasmania. Both flowering and non-flowering plants have a rosette of leaves lying flat on the ground and flowering plants have up to seven crowded, transparent green flowers with darker green stripes.

Description
Pterostylis rubenachii, is a terrestrial,  perennial, deciduous, herb with an underground tuber. The dorsal sepal and petals are joined to form a hood called the "galea" over the column. The dorsal sepal is gently curved but suddenly curves downward near the tip and is about the same length as the petals. Flowering occurs in October and November.

Taxonomy and naming
Pterostylis rubenachii was first formally described in 1998 by David Jones from a specimen collected in 1837 and the description was published in Australian Orchid Research. The specific epithet (rubenachii) honours Les Rubenach who is one of the few people to have found this species.

Distribution and habitat

Conservation
Pterostylis rubenachii  is listed as  "endangered" under the Australian Government Environment Protection and Biodiversity Conservation Act 1999 and the Tasmanian Government Threatened Species Protection Act 1995. Only about 800 plants of this species survive, mostly in the Arthur-Pieman Conservation Area. It is threatened by weed invasion, cattle grazing and off-road vehicles.

References

rubenachii
Endemic orchids of Australia
Orchids of Tasmania
Plants described in 1998